Muncurlu is a village in the Düzce District of Düzce Province in Turkey. Its population is 1,387 (2022). The Physical Therapy and Rehabilitation Center of the Düzce Atatürk State Hospital is located in the village.

The village has a pond owned by the Düzce municipality, who are planning to build a restaurant, wedding venue, zipline and a playground. A bus line from Muncurlu to the Düzce city is operated by the municipality since 2016.

References

Villages in Düzce District